Vilhelm Pavlovych Tellinher (20 October 1950 – 24 January 2013) was a Soviet professional football forward and coach from Ukraine.

Tellinher was a product of Lokomotyv Mukacheve football academy.

References

External links
 

1950 births
2013 deaths
People from Mukachevo
Ukrainian people of Hungarian descent
Soviet footballers
Ukrainian footballers
Soviet Top League players
FC Volyn Lutsk players
FC Karpaty Mukacheve players
FC Hoverla Uzhhorod players
SKA Lviv players
PFC CSKA Moscow players
FC SKA Rostov-on-Don players
FC Podillya Khmelnytskyi players
Soviet Union under-21 international footballers
Soviet football managers
Ukrainian football managers
FC Halychyna Drohobych managers
FC Karpaty Mukacheve managers
Ukrainian expatriate football managers
Expatriate football managers in Hungary
Association football forwards
Sportspeople from Zakarpattia Oblast